Sidorova is a rural locality (a village) in Verkh-Invenskoye Rural Settlement, Kudymkarsky District, Perm Krai, Russia. The population was 13 as of 2010.

Geography 
It is located 18 km south-west from Kudymkar.

References 

Rural localities in Kudymkarsky District